James K. Hoffmeier (born February 13, 1951 in Egypt) is an American Old Testament scholar, an archaeologist and an egyptologist. He was Professor of Old Testament and Ancient Near Eastern History and Archaeology at Trinity Evangelical Divinity School.

Hoffmeier has degrees from Wheaton College and a PhD, University of Toronto.

He specialises in issues of Old Testament historicity and archaeology.

During the period from 1975 to 1977, he worked on the Akhenaten Temple Project based in Luxor. He has been the Professor of Archaeology and Old Testament at Wheaton College. He was director of excavations at Tell el-Borg, Sinai from 1998 to 2008. Additionally he is often called upon as a consultant for television programs made for the History, Discovery, Learning, and National Geographic Channels.

Hoffmeier is a biblical maximalist and has often published works which defend the historicity of the Pentateuch.

Works

Books

Articles and chapters

References

1951 births
Living people
American biblical scholars
Old Testament scholars
Trinity International University faculty
University of Toronto alumni
Wheaton College (Illinois) alumni